Donald George Sahlin  (June 19, 1928 – May 29, 1978) was a Muppet designer and builder who worked for Jim Henson from 1962 to 1977.

Sahlin began making puppets at age 11, initially building a shadow theater and cardboard figurines. As an adult he built several puppets for Kukla, Fran and Ollie and created special effects sequences for films such as G.I. Blues and The Time Machine.

His first creation for Jim Henson was Rowlf the Dog, which he built in 1962 for a series of Purina Dog Chow commercials. Don would go on to design and build most of the Muppet characters, including Bert and Ernie, Grover, and Cookie Monster among others. His character designs are often recognizable for their spheroid heads partially bisected to create large mouths. Although always based on sketches by Jim Henson, the Muppet founder regularly stated that it was Sahlin who should be credited with creating the actual Muppet "look", and Henson later had a bench in London dedicated to his memory. The series finale of Fraggle Rock is also dedicated to him. After all the regular credits have been shown, a special credit appears which reads "This show is for Don Sahlin".

References

External links

Muppet designers
1928 births
1978 deaths
People from Stratford, Connecticut
Special effects people